Fredrik Bringnäs (born February 4, 1988, in Linköping)  is a former Swedish ice hockey player.

References

External links

1988 births
Linköping HC players
Living people
Swedish ice hockey defencemen
Sportspeople from Linköping